Gordon Neil Bilney (21 June 193928 October 2012) was an Australian politician. He was an Australian Labor Party member of the Australian House of Representatives for the seat of Kingston from 1983 to 1996.

Bilney was born in Renmark, South Australia. Prior to entering politics, Bilney was a diplomat, and his first chosen occupation, prior to that, was dentistry. He served as Deputy Permanent Representative of Australia to the OECD from 1975 to 1978 and as the Australian High Commissioner to the West Indies from 1980 to 1982, in Jamaica.

He was first elected to federal parliament at the 1983 federal election when the Labor Party, under the leadership of Bob Hawke, defeated the Liberal-National Party government which had held government under prime minister Malcolm Fraser. He won the seat of Kingston, based in the southern suburbs of Adelaide, South Australia, defeating incumbent Liberal MP Grant Chapman. Bilney was subsequently re-elected to the same seat at the 1984, 1987, 1990 and 1993 elections.

Between 1990 and 1996, Bilney was a minister in the Labor governments of Bob Hawke and Paul Keating. He was the Minister for Defence Science and Personnel from 1990 to 1993 and the Minister for Development Cooperation and Pacific Island Affairs from 1993 to 1996.

Bilney was defeated by Liberal candidate Susan Jeanes at the 1996 federal election.

Bilney died on 28 October 2012 at the age of 73.

References

External links

 Parlinfo: Biography for BILNEY, the Hon. Gordon Neil

1939 births
2012 deaths
Australian Labor Party members of the Parliament of Australia
Members of the Australian House of Representatives
Members of the Australian House of Representatives for Kingston
People from Renmark, South Australia
Australian dentists
University of Adelaide alumni
High Commissioners of Australia to Barbados
High Commissioners of Australia to Jamaica
High Commissioners of Australia to Trinidad and Tobago
20th-century Australian politicians
20th-century dentists